The Reason is the ninth studio album from American Country band Diamond Rio, released on September 22, 2009, by Word Records, their second and final studio release with the label.

Track listing

 "The Reason" (Joe Beck, Jimmy Olander, Marty Roe) - 3:08
 "This Is My Life" (Olander, Roe, Matthew West) - 3:52
 "God Is There" (Bernie Herms, Olander, Roe) - 4:19
 "Reaching for Me" (Michael Boggs, Chad R. Cates) - 3:40
 "Into Your Hands" (Chris Eaton, Olander, Roe) - 4:08
 "Just Love" (Eaton, Olander, Roe) - 4:16
 "Moments of Heaven on Earth" (Don Pfrimmer, Dan Truman) - 3:43
 "My God Does" (Sarah Buxton, Bob DiPiero, Craig Wiseman) - 3:45
 "Wherever I Am" (Olander, Roe, West) - 3:55
 "What Are We Gonna Do Now" (Beck, Chaz Bosarge, Dana Williams) - 4:15
 "In God We Still Trust" (Rob LeClair, Bill Nash, Kim Nash) - 3:22

Personnel 
Diamond Rio
 Marty Roe – lead vocals
 Dan Truman – pianos, keyboards 
 Jimmy Olander – acoustic guitar, electric guitars
 Gene Johnson – mandolin, tenor vocals
 Dana Williams – bass, baritone vocals
 Brian Prout – drums

Production 
 Diamond Rio – producers
 Mike Clute – producer, engineer, mixing 
 Hank Williams – mastering 
 Jamie Kiner – A&R 
 Katherine Petillo – art direction, design 
 Russ Harrington – photography 
 Paula Turner – grooming

Awards

At the 41st GMA Dove Awards, The Reason won a Dove Award for Country Album of the Year. Also, the song "God Is There" was nominated for Song of the Year and Country Recorded Song of the Year.

On February 13, 2011, the album won the Grammy Award for Best Southern, Country or Bluegrass Gospel Album.

Chart performance

References

2009 albums
Diamond Rio albums
Word Records albums